Onward Christian Soldiers is a 1918 British silent romance film directed by Rex Wilson and starring Isobel Elsom, Owen Nares and Minna Grey.

Cast
 Isobel Elsom - The Girl 
 Owen Nares - The Soldier 
 Minna Grey - The Sister 
 Tom Reynolds - The Man

References

External links

1918 films
1910s romance films
Films directed by Rex Wilson
British silent feature films
British black-and-white films
British romance films
1910s English-language films
1910s British films
English-language romance films